Monosacra is a genus of beetles in the family Buprestidae, containing the following species:

 Monosacra lalandi (Laporte & Gory, 1836)
 Monosacra namaqua (Peringuey, 1892)
 Monosacra oculata (Thumberg, 1789)
 Monosacra pagana (Olivier, 1790)

References

Buprestidae genera